Ludolf Bakhuizen (28 December 1630 – 7 November 1708) was a German-born Dutch painter, draughtsman, calligrapher and printmaker. He was the leading Dutch painter of maritime subjects after Willem van de Velde the Elder and Younger left for England in 1672.  He also painted portraits of his family and circle of friends.

Life
He was born in Emden, East Frisia, and came to Amsterdam in about 1650, working as a merchant's clerk and a calligrapher. He discovered so strong a genius for painting that he relinquished the business and devoted himself to art from the late 1650s, initially in pen drawings. He studied first under Allart van Everdingen and then under Hendrik Dubbels, two eminent masters of the time, and soon became celebrated for his sea-pieces, which often had rough seas.

He was an ardent student of nature, and frequently exposed himself on the sea in an open boat in order to study the effects of storms. His compositions, which are numerous, are nearly all variations of one subject, the sea, and in a style peculiarly his own, marked by intense realism or faithful imitation of nature. He moved frequently and lived at Haarlemmerstraat, Nes and N.Z. Voorburgwal, Singel and Herengracht. Bakhuizen assisted Bartholomeus van der Helst in 1668. In his later years Bakhuizen employed his skills in etching; he also painted a few examples each of several other genres of painting, such as portraits, landscapes and genre paintings. Bakhuizen painted portraits of his large circle of friends. These are of lesser artistic value but provide an insight into his good relations with contemporary scholars and literary figures.

During his life Bakhuizen was visited by Cosimo III de' Medici, Peter the Great and also worked for various German princes.  In 1699 he opened a gallery on the top floor of the Amsterdam townhall. After a visit to England he was buried on 12 November 1708.

Gallery

Notes

References

 

Attribution:

External links

 

 "Ships in Distress in a Heavy Storm", Rijksmuseum

1630 births
1708 deaths
People from Emden
Dutch Golden Age painters
Dutch male painters
German Baroque painters
Dutch landscape painters
Dutch marine artists
German emigrants to the Dutch Republic